Journey from the Fall is a 2006 independent film by writer/director/editor Ham Tran, about the Vietnamese re-education camp and boat people experience following the Fall of Saigon on April 30, 1975. This drama was released on March 23, 2007, by ImaginAsian to sold-out screenings. The film is notable for having been financed entirely by the Vietnamese American community.

Plot
The film traces the story of a family's struggle for survival in the aftermath of the Fall of Saigon on April 30, 1975, to North Vietnam's communist regime. After her South Vietnamese Army husband Long, is imprisoned in a North Vietnamese re-education camp, Mai, her son Lai, and her mother-in-law escape Vietnam by boat in the hopes of starting a new life in Southern California. Believing his family is dead, Long gives up in the face of brutal conditions, while Mai struggles to keep her family from crumbling under the pressures of life in a new country. When Long learns his family is alive in America, he is reinvigorated and decides he must join them at any cost.

Cast
 Diem Lien as Mai Nguyen
 Kieu Chinh as Ba Noi (Grandmother)
 Long Nguyen as Long Nguyen
 Nguyen Thai Nguyen as Lai Nguyen
 Cat Ly as Phuong
 Xavier Ortiz as Bully

Reception
The film was received with critical acclaim. In the review aggregation website Rotten Tomatoes, it received a score of 92% with a certified "Fresh" rating with the consensus being that "Ham Tran's ambitious film proves to be extremely powerful due to stunning photography and passionate performances" and is currently ranked 27th in the Top 100 Best Movies of 2007.

Matt Zoller Seitz of The New York Times remarked that the director "achieves the impossible" and called it a "tearjerker".

The Los Angeles Times called it a "superbly wrought saga of loss and survival" and "an example of sophisticated, impassioned filmmaking involving mainly people who lived through the harrowing experiences so unsparingly depicted".

Bruce Newman of the San Jose Mercury News called it "heartbreaking" and gave it 4.5 out of 5 stars.

Russell Edwards from Variety said it "deserves to be seen by a wider commercial audience" and is "frequently enthralling".

New York magazine had a negative review of the film, saying that it has "several powerful sequences" but "never quite come[s] alive".

Bill White of the Seattle Post-Intelligencer was even more critical, suggesting that "this Journey doesn't know where it's going", criticizing the "careless cinematography" and "clumsy stag[ing]".

Response from Vietnamese diaspora
An early cut of the film was screened in April 2005 in sold-out one-day-only showings in Little Saigon, Washington, D.C., and San Jose to commemorate the 30 year anniversary of the Fall of Saigon. The film was highly praised by the Vietnamese diaspora as an accurate presentation of the experiences that many Vietnamese people had to go through. In the process of making the film, the director interviewed more than 400 former boat people, some of whom are cast in the film even though they are not professional actors.

Awards
 Grand Jury Prize –  Amazonas International Film Festival, Brazil
 Winner, Best Feature Film – Anchorage International Film Festival
 Winner, Best Cinematography –  Milano International Film Festival
 Winner, Long Nguyen, Best Actor –  Newport Beach Film Festival
 Special Jury Prize –  Newport Beach Film Festival
 Audience Award –  San Francisco International Asian American Film Festival
 Grand Jury Award –  San Diego Asian Film Festival
 Jury Award –  Dallas Asian Film Festival
 Winner, Ham Tran, Best Director –  Asian Festival of First Film
 Winner, Lam Nguyen, Best Producer – Asian Festival of First Film
 Audience Award –  Toronto Reel Asian International Film Festival
 Special Project Award –  The Princess Grace Foundation, USA
 Best Feature Film – Boulder International Film Festival
 Winner, Best Feature Film – Vietnamese International Film Festival
 Best Independent Film –  Asian Excellence Award

The film was not eligible for competition in the Sundance Film Festival even though it was an official selection because it was screened prior at a Korean film festival (only world premieres of films at Sundance are eligible for competition).

Controversies
The OC Weekly, an alternative weekly in Orange County, California, published two reviews of the film. The first and longer review was written by R. Scott Moxley, praised the director for "bring[ing] to life the true South Vietnamese experience". The second and much shorter review was published almost a year later, written by Scott Foundas. In his review, Foundas praised the film for being "one of the few movies to depict Vietnam and its aftermath through the eyes of the Vietnamese" but ultimately characterized it as "old-fashioned and even phony". This conclusion brought a flurry of letters to the paper, most disagreeing with Foundas and taking offense at his "phony" characterization, prompting Foundas to clarify his review, claiming that he was "by no means suggesting that the history depicted by the movie didn't happen, but rather that matters were not nearly as black-and-white as Mr. Tran makes them seem".

Following the negative ratings above, in Vietnam, where the film was neither filmed nor shown officially, unlicensed copies were so prevalent that the government issued orders to confiscate all DVD copies. The film was banned for its "reactionary" content. The government consider the film "defamation" and a "distortion" of its policy of sending people to re-education camps after 1975. The film was considered such a threat that the Ministry of Public Security's newspaper Công an Nhân dân featured an article (now through vietbao.vn) warning about the "poisonous film" and claiming that "most overseas Vietnamese are indifferent or critical of this movie". The article also quoted Foundas and several random people in online message boards to bolster its claim.

Release
The film is distributed by ImaginAsian Pictures, and released in Orange County, New York City, and San Jose on March 23, 2007, to sold-out screenings.

Since its opening weekend on March 23, 2007, it has expanded to Dallas, Houston, Washington, DC, San Diego, Chicago, San Francisco, Mountain View, Daly City, Seattle, Berkeley, Honolulu, Atlanta, Portland, Sacramento, Vancouver, and is expanding to other cities throughout the summer in what is called a "rolling release".

Box Office Performance
In the opening weekend, it played in packed theaters, generating $87,442 on just four screens, giving the film the largest per theater average for that weekend ($21,861).

As of July 16, the film has grossed over $630,000, despite a limited release that never exceeded fourteen theaters at a time.

Home media release
The 2-disc DVD was released on October 31, 2007, which includes a 38-minute The Making of Journey from the Fall, a 135-minute roundtable discussion/commentary with cast and crew, a deleted scene and alternate ending, as well as original theatrical trailer and TV spots.

See also
 Boat people
 Boat People (film)
 Overseas Vietnamese
 Vietnamese International Film Festival
 Bolinao 52
 The White Silk Dress

References

External links
 
 
 Interview with Ham Tran
 CBS 5 TV interview
 Journal from the Fall in YouTube
 Hành trình "vượt sóng" qua phim on BBC (Vietnamese)

2006 films
2006 drama films
Films about Vietnamese Americans
Vietnam War films
Vietnamese-language films
Films directed by Ham Tran
Vietnamese migration
Vietnamese refugees
Vietnamese historical films